The Peace Square may be:

 Sennaya Square, Saint Petersburg, Russia
 Peace Square (Taiwan), Keelung, Taiwan